Wells High School is a public school located in Wells, Nevada, United States. It has an enrollment of 118 students in grades 9 through 12. The school primarily serves students from Wells, as well as a number of students from Clover Valley, Metropolis, Montello, Oasis, and Deeth.  Wells High School made AYP in 2010. Under No Child Left Behind, a school makes Adequate Yearly Progress (AYP) if it achieves the minimum levels of improvement determined by the state of Nevada in terms of student performance and other accountability measures.

History
Wells High School was established in 1914 and suffered extensive damage in 2008 when Wells, Nevada was hit with a 6.0 earthquake.

Wells High School's gymnasium and auditorium building had significant damage from the shaking and required $2.478 million worth of work that was completed by the beginning of the 2008/2009 school year (about 6 months). This project was achieved and the building was indeed ready for use by the beginning of the school year. Earthquake damage was repaired in an up-to-code fashion, but only those elements that were damaged were repaired. Thus, the building was partially seismically strengthened.

Extracurricular activities

Athletics
The Leopards compete in the Northern Nevada 1A Region. Over the years, they have competed in different athletic conferences ranging from 1B to 2A, in which they won several state championships.

Nevada 2A state championships
 Football: 2000 & 2004
 Boys Cross Country: 1999, 2000, 2001
 Girl Cross Country: 1997
 Girls Golf: 2003, 2004, 2018

Nevada 1A state championships
 Boys Basketball: 1995
 Boys Track: 1981
 Girls Track: 1994, 2009, 2010, 2011, 2018
 Baseball: 2002, 2003 & 2005
 Softball: 2001, 2003, 2004

Nevada 1B state championships
 Boys Basketball: 1947
 Girls Basketball: 1986 & 1989
 Boys Track: 1987, 1988 & 1989
 Girls Track: 1987, 1988 & 1989

Nevada Interscholastic Activities Association
 NIAA Award of Excellence: 2004-2005

References 

Public high schools in Nevada
Schools in Elko County, Nevada